The Rebellion R13 is a sports prototype racing car built by French constructor Oreca on behalf of Swiss-based team Rebellion Racing. It is a variation of the Oreca 07, created to compete in the LMP1 class. It would later be renamed by Alpine to Alpine A480 when it was rebadged to run grandfathered into the Hypercar class in 2021 and 2022.

Competition history

2018–19
The R13 debuted in the FIA World Endurance Championship during its Super Season. Over the course of the season it achieved victory and fastest lap at the 2018 6 Hours of Silverstone, with further podiums at both Spa races, Fuji and the 2018 24 Hours of Le Mans, for a total of 6 for the season. Rebellion finished in 2nd place in the World Endurance LMP1 Championship with 134 points, making the R13 the best of the non-hybrid cars.

2019–20
For the 2019-20 season, Rebellion reduced their full-season effort to a single car; the #1 driven by Menezes, Nato and Senna, with a second car appearing in select European races. This would later translate to a second R13, the #3, appearing in the 2019 4 Hours of Silverstone, where it finished 3rd and the 2019 24 Hours of Le Mans, where it finished 4th, though those results would not count towards the championship as only the #1 was eligible for points.

For that season, the WEC introduced a system of success ballast, which slowed down cars' performance according to their results in the championship, with the aim of equaling the performance of non-hybrid cars, the R13 and the Ginetta G60-LT-P1, with that of the Toyota TS050 Hybrid. This system allowed the R13 to be more competitive to the TS050, and the #1 Rebellion would take 2 victories during the season at Shanghai and at Austin. At Shanghai, Rebellion would also become the first privateer team to get an overall pole position in WEC history, with that being also the first of the 4 consecutive pole positions the R13 would take during the season, with the rest coming in Bahrain, Austin, and Spa. The car would also set 3 fastest laps during the season, at Austin, Spa and Le Mans. Rebellion would skip the season finale at Bahrain after Toyota clinched the LMP1 teams' title at Le Mans, finishing second with 145 points and having scored podiums at all 7 rounds of the season it had been a part of.

Alpine A480
On September 10, 2020, French-language magazine Auto Hebdo reported that the Signatech Alpine team competing in LMP2 during the 2019–20 WEC season would step up to the new Le Mans Hypercar class for 2021 with a re-badged R13, with agreement that LMH rules in the initial season would include an allowance to re-homologate ("grandfather") non-hybrid LMP1 cars. The report was confirmed by Alpine on September 12. On January 21, 2021, the entry list for the 2021 FIA World Endurance Championship season was released, where the entry was confirmed and the car rename to Alpine A480 made official, with André Negrão being one of the drivers. The rest of the line-up was announced on January 26, with Nicolas Lapierre and Matthieu Vaxivière joining Negrão.

The initial LMH rules targeted a significantly lower performance than 2020 LMP1, adding around ten seconds to a lap of Circuit de la Sarthe, which made significant changes necessary to grandfathered cars to achieve homologation. These included:

 agreement to use a single aero kit - the Le Mans focused "low-downforce kit" - at all circuits through the season, a change from the WEC LMP1 rules and practice of mixing high-downforce and low-downforce kits as appropriate to the circuits.

 Participation in the new Hypercar class Balance of Performance (BoP) system to ensure parity between entrants in the class. The BoP envelope was set against the significantly lower target lap times and therefore had a high impact on the Alpine car originally built to meet the higher LMP1 specs and not designed for a BoP ruleset.
Furthermore, whilst changes to the fuel tank were not necessary to meet homologation, the fuel capacity within the chassis was originally designed around the LMP2 ruleset (75 litres). However, the Hypercar rules were designed around 12-lap stints for the Le Mans race. Once the changes for LMP1 and then grandfathering had been made, the fuel consumption of the car would not allow these 12 laps fuel stints from a 75 litre tank; and in the Rebellion era for this car it achieved only 11 laps even with LMP1's lower weight. For LMH, the BoP fuelling limit for the A480 was set to allow 12 laps but it was not possible to physically fit this allowance into the smaller tank, and Oreca were not able to find a workaround compatible with homologation in time for the inaugural race at Spa, where the disadvantage was enough to add an extra fuel stop compared to Toyota.

2021
Ahead of the formal pre-season testing sessions for registered 2021 entrants (known as the "Prologue" in WEC), the initial Balance of Performance for the A480's weight was increased to 930 kg (from LMP1's 824 kg) and its peak power output reduced to 610 hp (450 kW). The large weight penalty was necessary for parity with the heavier but more powerful Toyota GR010 Hybrid. 

During the 2021 season Alpine managed to score podiums in all six races, while also taking pole position and fastest lap at the 8 Hours of Portimão, scoring 128 points and finishing second in the Hypercar World Endurance Championship, never overcoming the stint-length deficit caused by their smaller fuel tank. Lapierre, Negrão and Vaxivière finished 3rd as a crew in the Hypercar World Endurance Drivers' Championship with the same points tally.

2022 
On 16th February 2022 Alpine announced that the car would complete for a further and final season with the same driver line-up of Lapierre, Negrão and Vaxivière.

Complete World Endurance Championship results
Results in bold indicate pole position. Results in italics indicate fastest lap.

 Only the highest-finishing car for each manufacturer scored points.
 Only the results of the full-season entry #1 counted towards the standings.

See also 
 Toyota TS050 Hybrid
 Ginetta G60-LT-P1
 BR Engineering BR1
 CLM P1/01

References

Le Mans Prototypes
24 Hours of Le Mans race cars
Sports prototypes